The Costa Rican National Road Race Championships are held annually to decide the cycling champions in the road race, across various categories.

Men

Women

See also
Costa Rican National Time Trial Championships

Footnotes

References

National road cycling championships
Cycle races in Costa Rica